Cimar was a Hoshino Gakki guitar brand. Designs of Cimar guitars are sometimes very similar to Hoshino Gakki's Ibanez guitar brand. Cimar guitars appear in Hoshino Gakki catalogues.

References
An Ibanez Catalogue that shows Cimar By Ibanez guitars on page 24
1976 Cimar Catalogue
 Pictures of Cimar guitars from the Vintage Ibanez Museum
 https://archive.today/20130218153537/http://www.ibanez.co.jp/anniversary/list.php?era=70&p=3
Cimar Modell 2070MH - Das Ende der großen Unbekannten (german only)

Guitar manufacturing companies
Musical instrument manufacturing companies of Japan